Taldykorgan, known as Taldy-Kurgan until 1993, is the capital (called an administrative center) of Zhetysu Region, Kazakhstan. According to the 2010 Kazakh Census Results, the population is 143,407.

The town was founded in the 19th century as the village of Gavrilovka and developed into the present city on the same site. The town grew slowly in its early years. After the completion of the railway connection many Russian farmers moved to the area of the town. Russians are the second-largest ethnic group after the Kazakhs among the 70 nationalities living in Taldykorgan. A total of 143,000 people live in the city. Taldykorgan previously served as the capital city of Taldykorgan Region from 1944 to 1997 and Almaty Region from 1997 to 2022 and now serves as the capital of the new Jetisu Region. The change was announced by President Tokayev on 16 March 2022 and officially came into force on 8 June 2022. In that same decree, the capital of Almaty Region was moved to the city of Konaev.

Facilities
Taldykorgan has a diverse range of educational facilities, including a university, institutes, institutions, technical training colleges, secondary schools and kindergartens. There are 27 public health facilities, a city cinema, a theatre, libraries, amusement parks, a stadium and sports complex and swimming pools. Some facilities have been poorly maintained since the end of the Soviet era.

Demographics
The ethnic composition of Taldykorgan according to the 2010 Kazakh Census was:

Climate
According to the Köppen climate classification system, Taldıqorğan has a hot, dry-summer continental climate. There is more rainfall in spring and autumn while winter and summer have mostly dry weather. About  of precipitation falls annually.

Transport
Taldykorgan Airport services Nur-sultan. Its train station services Central Kazakhstan, Central Asia, Russia, the Baltic States and the People's Republic of China.

Sport
The city has a football club, FC Zhetysu Taldykorgan.

Notable residents

 Andrei Kivilev (1973 - 2003) - professional bicycle racer.
 Sergey Vodopyanov (born 1987) - Russian amateur boxer, winner gold in bantamweight Class at the 2007 World Amateur Boxing Championships.
 Alibek Buleshev (born 1981) - Kazakh football forward.
 Mirat Sarsembayev (born 1986) - amateur boxer from Kazakhstan, best known for winning the flyweight bronze at the 2005 World Amateur Boxing Championships.
 Victor Sydorenko (born 1953) - painter, curator, teacher, an author of objects and photocompositions and also scientific and publicistic texts, member and the vice-president of Ukrainian Academy of Arts.
 Marian Handwerker (born 1944) film director born in Taldykorgan

Sister cities
 Antalya, Turkey.
 Manchester, United Kingdom.

References

Further reading
Bozdaqtar. Taldyqorghan oblysy, 1995,

External links

 Taldykorgan
 2007 Soccer team

Populated places in Almaty Region
Cities and towns in Kazakhstan